Peter Rosei (born in Vienna on 17 June 1946) is an Austrian literary writer.

Rosei attended the University of Vienna, where he earned a doctorate in law in 1968. He worked for a time as the personal assistant to the Viennese painter Ernst Fuchs and then as the director of a publishing house for textbooks and nonfiction.

Since 1972 he has been a freelance writer, publishing novels, stories, essays, poetry, plays, travelogues, and children's literature. He has traveled extensively and intensively throughout the world and has been a guest writer at Oberlin College, Bowling Green State University, and the University of New Mexico at Taos, as well as guest professor at the University of Nagoya, Japan.

His literary breakthrough came with the novel Wer war Edgar Allan (Who was Edgar Allan) in 1977, which was filmed by the Austrian director Michael Haneke, with a screenplay by Rosei, in 1984.  His fictional texts portray the limits of knowledge and the discrepancies between thought and action in Western society.  Rosei's prolific output includes the novels Die Milchstrasse (The Milky Way, 1981), Rebus (1990), and Persona (1995), as well as a six-part novel cycle titled Das 15 000-Seelen-Projekt (The 15,000 Souls Project) from 1984–1988. In 2005 he published a panoramic novel of Vienna during the postwar period, Wien Metropolis (Metropolis Vienna).

Works that have been translated into English include Von hier nach dort (1978) (From Here to There, translated by Kathleen Thorpe, 1991), Das schnelle Glück (1980) (Try Your Luck, translated by Kathleen Thorpe, 1994), and Ruthless and Other Writings (translated by Geoffrey Howes, 2003), all published by Ariadne Press; and Wien Metropolis (2005) (Metropolis Vienna, translated by Geoffrey C. Howes, published by Green Integer in 2009).

Decorations and awards
 1973: Rauris Literature Prize
 1980: Literature of the Cultural Fund of the City of Salzburg,
 1986: Elias Canetti scholarship of Vienna
 1987: Literature Prize of Salzburg
 1991: Austrian Prize for Literature
 1993: Franz Kafka Prize of the City of Klosterneuburg
 1996: Austrian Cross of Honour for Science and Art
 1997: Literature Prize of Vienna
 1999: Anton Wildgans Prize
 2006: Austrian Cross of Honour for Science and Art, 1st class

References

Further reading
 Thorpe, Kathleen (September 1999). "Peter Rosei – A Case Study" (in English). TRANS: Internet-Zeitschrift für Kulturwissenschaften. Research Institute for Austrian and International Literature and Cultural Studies (INST).

1946 births
Living people
Austrian male writers
University of Vienna alumni
Anton Wildgans Prize winners
Recipients of the Austrian Cross of Honour for Science and Art, 1st class